Tyrone Walker (born May 21, 1990), known by his stage name ASAP TyY (stylized as A$AP TyY), is an American rapper from the Harlem neighborhood of Manhattan, New York. He is a member of the Harlem, New York based hip hop collective A$AP Mob (including, most notably, A$AP Rocky and A$AP Ferg), from which he adopted his "A$AP" moniker.

TyY's singles "O Well" and "Chamber Lock" feat. A$AP Yams" in 2015, as well as "Remain the Same" in 2016, were the first to be featured on major blogs and publications. His features on hip hop websites such as HotNewHipHop and Complex would serve as a precursor for TyY before releasing his debut mixtape, "BEST KEPT SECRET" in April 2016. After the release of the 19-track mixtape, TyY went on to release four more singles. His most popular song was titled "Trump", a track aimed at the would-be President of the United States would draw ire from Trump supporters and praise from the President's detractors. In early 2017, TyY had his first headline tour, performing throughout Europe and the United Kingdom.

In addition to music, TyY has also taken part in fashion, art, and street culture. An avid dirt bike fan, TyY  popularized the Bike Life subculture of New York City. Utilizing his platform as a rapper and rider, TyY would release his first ever art exhibit in 2014, as well as 2 signature ski-goggles, for which he partnered with the Brooklyn-based designer, KidSuper.

Musical career

2012–2014: Beginnings & A$AP Mob
By early 2012, TyY had garnered recognition as a biker on the streets of Harlem. Utilizing his newfound platform, TyY would release his first track, a collaboration between himself and Young Money Yawn entitled "Comme Des Fawk Down", in early 2014.

2015–2016: Best Kept Secret
Though he had created a following for himself prior to becoming a rapper, it was not until 2015 when TyY's rapping career truly began. In early 2015, TyY released the track "Chamber Lock" , which included an intro from his friend, deceased A$AP Mob founder, A$AP Yams. After "Chamber Lock" , TyY went on to create his next single, "O Well" on June 2, 2015, before dropping "Remain the Same" in February 2016. All three tracks would appear on TyY's debut mixtape, "BEST KEPT SECRET", which dropped on April 13, 2016.

2016–2017: European tour
After the premiere of his debut mixtape, TyY would release three singles; "Bust It Open" on September 21, "Trump" on November 7, and the collaboration between himself & BewhY, "Like Me" on December 28. In early 2017, capitalizing on the success of his most recent projects, TyY would embark on his first headline tour; a 5-day, 3 country, tour taking place in Paris, Amsterdam, and London.

Cozy Tapes Vol. 2: Too Cozy
On August 25, 2017, ASAP Mob released its second studio album, Cozy Tapes Vol. 2: Too Cozy. The album was released by ASAP Worldwide, Polo Grounds Music, and RCA Records.

TyY would be featured on the 8th track, titled "Get the Bag." The track also featured ASAP Rocky, ASAP Ferg, ASAP Ant, ASAP Nast, Playboi Carti and Smooky Margielaa.

Troubles of the World
On April 19, 2018 TyY released his first mixtape/album, Troubles of The World. The songs featured OG Maco, Lamont Sincere, A$AP Ant and Macca Wiles.

Non-music ventures

Fashion
On December 16, 2016, TyY partnered with Brooklyn-based designer, KidSuper, to create a pair of dual-branded ski-goggles; with the ASAP Mob and KidSuper logos being featured on each side of the piece. The goggles were inspired by Bike Life's signature look of wearing them while riding his ATV through the streets of New York City.

In the summer of 2017, TyY would launch multiple collections with a variety of brands. Most notably, during Paris Fashion Week, TyY partnered with Milan-based designer, Guntas. The line was a marquee feature of Guntas' Spring 2018 collection.

Bike Life
TyY is known for popularizing and leading the subculture of Bike Life, a Harlem counter-culture known for their love of ATV's, dirt bikes and riding them on the streets of New York.  The NYPD has expressed disapproval, as the vehicles are not street legal. The group still continues to ride to this day.

Discography

Mixtapes

Singles

Guest appearances

Music videos

References

African-American male rappers
1990 births
People from Harlem
Rappers from Manhattan
Living people
21st-century American rappers
21st-century American male musicians
21st-century African-American musicians